The Big Bethel AME Church is the oldest African-American congregation in the Sweet Auburn neighborhood of Atlanta, Georgia, and according to AME historical documents, it is the mother church of AME in North Georgia. It is located at 220 Auburn Avenue NE in the Sweet Auburn neighborhood. It is the "first" church on the North Atlanta District, in the Atlanta-North Georgia Annual Conference of the African Methodist Episcopal Church.

Big Bethel was founded in 1847 as Union Church in the town of Marthasville, Georgia. Marthasville became Terminus, and finally Atlanta, and Union Church became Bethel Church, then Bethel Tabernacle. At the close of the Civil War, the AME Church spread rapidly throughout the former Confederacy, and the Bethel Tabernacle allied herself with the denomination, becoming Bethel African Methodist Episcopal Church. Her first pastor was Rev. Joseph Woods.

In 1879, the first public school for blacks in Atlanta, Gate City Colored School, was founded in the basement of the church, though it would later move to Houston Street. Morris Brown College held its first classes here in 1881 before moving to its first campus. Big Bethel was known as "Sweet Auburn's City Hall." In 1911, President William Howard Taft spoke here, as did Nelson Mandela in 1990.

Heaven Bound is a show written by congregants that is performed annually at the church.

References

External links
Official Website
Time magazine, Aug. 10, 1931, Religion: Heaven Bound; also available from Big Bethel site
Old bus used for advertising the church (IMCDb)

African Methodist Episcopal churches in Georgia (U.S. state)
Methodist churches in Atlanta
Old Fourth Ward
Martin Luther King Jr. National Historic Site and Preservation District
Sweet Auburn